Brehon is a term for a historical arbitration, mediative and judicial role in Gaelic culture. Brehons were part of the system of Early Irish law, which was also simply called "Brehon law". Brehons were judges, close in importance to the chiefs.

History
Ireland's indigenous system of law dates from the Iron Age. Known as Brehon law, it developed from customs which had been passed on orally from one generation to the next. Brehon law was administered by brehons. They were similar to judges, though their role was closer to that of arbitrators. Their task was to preserve and interpret the law.

In the history of the Kingdom of Dublin, the Gaelic Irish recaptured the city from the Norse Vikings after the Battle of Tara. Dublin was officially founded in 988 when the Norse King Glúniairn first recognised Máel Sechnaill mac Domnaill as the High King of Ireland, he also agreed to pay taxes and accept Brehon law. The city celebrated its millennium in 1988 to mark 1000 years from its founding. Even though this event was seen as the first recorded establishment of the city, evidence exists of other settlements on the River Liffey prior to this event, one being Viking known as Dyflin and the other Gaelic Irish known as Átha Cliath (Ford of Hurdles).

A Megalithic site exists in Rathfarnham, County Dublin, known as Brehon's Chair or Druid's Table. It is believed to be the seat of judgment for the Archdruid in prehistoric times.

The brehons of ancient Ireland were wise individuals who memorised and applied the laws to settle disputes among members of an extended family. Some brehons were attached to clans, and were allotted a portion of land for their support. Others lived independently by their profession. They were recognised as a professional class apart from druids and bards, and became, by custom, to a large extent hereditary. The term "bard" is associated with a Brehon family of poets, called Mac an Bháird (Son of the Bard). They were one of the descendants of the ancient tribes of Soghain in the Kingdom of Uí Maine.

In ancient Ireland, Brehons, as part of the leading members of society, would take part in an event which took place every three years on Samhain known as Feis Teamhrach (Festival of Tara) in the House of the Banquets (Teach Moidhchuarta) at the Hill of Tara. The assembly was also originally referred to as an Aonach in prehistoric times. It was a national event with the purpose of resolving any regional disputes regarding title to rank, property and privilege. They would be settled by the lawmakers, the Brehons, and all annals and records would be carefully noted and entered by the Ard Ollams in the official records. The event was founded in a very early period and lasted until 560 AD when the last assembly was held by King Dermot, son of Fergus.

The preparatory course of study extended over some twenty years. The Brehon laws were originally composed in poetic verse to aid memorisation. Brehons were liable for damages if their rulings were incorrect, illegal or unjust. When one brehon had adjudicated on a matter submitted to him, there could be no appeal to another brehon of the same rank; but there might be an appeal to a higher court, provided the appellant gave security. The ranking of a brithem was based on their skill, and on whether they knew all three components of law: traditional law, poetry, and (added later) canon law.

In Prechristian Medieval Ireland prior to the earliest written manuscript. Law was practised by hereditary judges known as bards or fili, who passed on information orally down the generations, they held the positions of Ollam to a provincial High king or rí.

In pre-Norman times, it was the King who passed judgment, when necessary, following recitation of applicable law and advice from the Brehon.

While originating in oral legal history, it is a common belief that Brehon law enacted the first piece of copyright legislation in relation to written text in world legal history. It involved a bitter dispute around 561 AD between Saint Colmcille and Saint Finian over the authorship of a manuscript called "St Jerome's Psalter". Despite the enactment of the law by the king, a bloody conflict still took place known as Battle of Cúl Dreimhne, which resulted in many deaths.

One of the main responsibilities of a Brehon was to record the genealogies of the people. One of the most notable Brehons associated with recording genealogies was the Clan Mac Fhirbhisigh. Dubhaltach Mac Fhirbhisigh produced Leabhar na nGenealach, also the abridgment version Cuimre na nGenealach and Great Book of Lecan. The genealogist would also be referred to in old Irish as a Seanchaidhe. The basic family unit under brehon law in ancient Ireland was defined as Derbfine, or "True Kin" in English Another Brehon family noted for recording genealogies were the Ó Cléirigh, such as Mícheál Ó Cléirigh, the author of the Annals of the Four Masters.

In 2000 controversial Irish lawyer Vincent Salafia founded the Brehon Law Project, to promote the academic study of Brehon law. The courses were formed to aid the funding of the translation of early Irish Law manuscripts and to make the study of Ancient Irish Law available for academic scholarship.

Several dozen families were recognised as hereditary brehon clans.

Aisling poetry
Within the bardic tradition, a poetic genre developed during the 17th century known as the aisling, it was a political form of poetry based on a vision or a dream, the poems invariably involved the visitation of a lady like figure sometimes carrying a message or prophecy and symbolically representing Ireland. The first fully developed Aisling was produced by Aodhagán Ó Rathaille who was related to the Brehons who served as Ollamhs to the Mac Cárthaigh Mór family. Aodhagán Ó Rathaille attended one of the last bardic schools in Killarney before all these ancient Gaelic bardic institutions where suppressed towards the end of the 17th century, the aisling replaced the Dán Díreach, an older style of poetry that came to an end with destruction of Gaelic society. He is said to have been a bridge between the old world in which he was educated and the new one in which the professional poet had no place. He wrote in the new metres but preserved the attitudes of a previous age.

Other notable classifications of aisling poetry or sometimes in the form of musical lyrics in Irish history and culture include Róisín Dubh, Mná na hÉireann, Aisling Óenguso (The Dream of Óengus), in his dream Aengus sees the most beautiful woman in Eriu standing next to his bed, The Song of Wandering Aengus, an old man sees a silver trout transform into glimmering girl before vanishing, The Vision of Adamnán, it was said the Cáin Adomnáin(Law of Innocents) was prompted by Adomnáin's Aisling or Vision of his mother, instructing him to protect women and children against harm and "Aisling an Óigfhir" ("The Young Man's Dream"), which later influenced the tune of "The Last Rose of Summer", some historians have suggested it formed the origins of the tune used for Londonderry Air. Aisling an Óigfhir first appeared in Edward Bunting's collection, The Ancient Music of Ireland.

(Salmon of Knowledge)

The salmon fish has a significant importance in Irish mythology and folklore.

One story states that Fionn Mac Cumhaill, a great warrior, received great knowledge or "fios" by devouring the flesh of a salmon. According to the legend the salmon had eaten from a hazel tree that surrounded the Well of Segais. By this act the salmon gained all the world's knowledge. The first person to eat its flesh, in turn, would gain this knowledge.

The salmon is also connected mythologically to the Celtic Otherworld and the tales of the Sidhe. Symbolically it can exist in two worlds, one being the freshwater rivers and also in the otherworld being in the saltwater of the sea. There is a story mentioned in the Annal of the Four Masters about Tuan mac Cairill, who is said to have lived during the age of the Patholónians. He had the supernatural ability to shape-shift into different forms of creature, the final form being a salmon, just before being eaten by the wife of a chieftain called Cairill, who later gave birth to him as human once again. He lived for several thousand years in numerous different reincarnations as animals and seen through their eyes the coming of the different ages and invaders throughout Irish history, right up to the dawning of the Christian age. He was known as the "seer" or the storehouse of knowledge of Irish history. Fintan mac Bóchra also transformed into a salmon in a place now known as Fintan's Grave near Lough Derg, he arrived with the first settlers in Ireland, the Cessairians.

Brehon laws and the early Irish church (Céilí Dé)
With the birth of Christianity in Ireland, in regard to the older Brehon Civil laws and Pre-Christian customs, efforts were made to assimilate them into the earliest Christian movement in Ireland known as the Céilí Dé or in English the Culdees by its founding Saints/Monks. One of the example is the ancient practice of crafting a Brigid's cross and the surrounding myths associated with it had been a Imbolc custom associated with the pagan goddesses Brigid, these customs were adopted and incorporated into the early Irish Christian church. Some of the Culdee Saints were brought up in pagan traditions before being converted to the new belief system. In contrast to the version Roman of Christianity, the Celtic or Culdee Religion was influenced by nature and the natural world, many of the oldest saints (only later became romanised), were associated with Holy wells, hills and trees which was a tradition that goes back to the ancient worship of Celtic Gods and Goddessess of the Pre-Christian Pagan world, an example is the custom of Clootie well.

Tallaght Abbey (Mainistir Tamhlacht)
Tallaght Abbey became the mother house of the Culdee (Céile Dé) movement. Tallaght or Tamlacht in Irish means 'burial ground', it was a pagan plague-burial ground that was connected with the people of Parthalón. It was such an important institution that it and the monastery at Finglas were known as the "two eyes of Ireland". Saint Máel Ruain was founder and abbot-bishop of the monastery of Tallaght (Co. Dublin, Ireland). He had been a disciple of Óengus the Culdee, a son of a Óengobann, a king of Dál nAraidi. The monastery produced a comprehensive martyrology of Irish Culdee Saints and some non-Irish Saints ina manuscript known as the Félire Óengusso Céli Dé in Tallaght Monastery. Today St. Maelruain's stands on the grounds the original monastery once stood. Máel Ruain and Óengus were said to have been the authors of a text, which sets out the rule of the Céilí Dé monks. One of the earliest Celtic Rite books, the Stowe Missal was completed in Tallaght Monastery, not long after the death of Saint Máel Ruain and then carried by an anchorite called Máel Dithruib to the monasteries at Terryglass and Lorrha. Saint Máel Ruain was known to be a Anam Cara to this same abbot, Máel Dithruib of Terryglass. The abecedarian hymn of Archangelum mirum magnum is attributed to Mael Ruain. The Hiberno-Latin hymn is in praise of St. Michael, whose name is associated with the founding of the Tallaght Monastery, a copy of the song is found in Karlsruhe, Badische Landesbibliothek.

Other Culdee monasteries and saints

Armagh (Ard Mhacha)
Some of the locations of the earliest Culdee churches were sited near or on top of what used to be important Pre-Christian sites. In Ireland, a notable example is when Saint Patrick choose to build his first stone church in Ireland, he decided to build it as close as possible to the Ancient Druidic site of Emain Macha. The oldest of the two Cathedrals in Armagh is located on a steep sided hill which Queen Macha allegedly had chosen as a defense of the ancient Fortress at Emain Macha in Pre-Christian times.

Blathmac
The find in 1953 of the old Irish poems of Blathmac, constituted the largest ever addition of text to the corpus of Early Irish, some parts of it also still remain untranslated and unpublished due to its poor condition. They were discovered among a collection of ancient seventeenth century manuscripts, which had once belonged to the Brehon and scribe Mícheál Ó Cléirigh, it was found by a twenth century  Dublin Institute for Advanced Studies scholar, Nessa Ní Shéaghdha. The poems were edited and published eleven years later by James Carney in Vol. 47 of the Irish Texts Society monographs. They date back to the 8th century, possibly earlier and consisted of detailed references to the importance Christ and to the Virgin Mary. Carney had suggested that Blathmac may have originally come from filí and druidic background but later been a convert to become part of the Culdee Reform movement through a detailed study of the structure of his poetry, which resembled in style to the Félire Óengusso.

Clonmacnoise (Cluain Mhic Nóis)
An important Culdee monastery was Clonmacnoise: the Annals of the Four Masters mention Conn na mbocht (Conn of the Paupers), who was head of the Culdees and Bishop of Clonmacnoise. Much of the information of Pagan or Pre-Christian Ireland was transferred into text by monks and scholars for the first time at Clonmacnoise from what had previously been Orally passed down generations. With the arrival of the Christian age, the Martyrology of Oengus highlighted the growing emergence of the religious power of Clonmacnoise in contrast at that time to the diminishing importance of the Pre-Christian site of the Cruachan. The Rathcroghan Pagan tale of the Táin Bó Cúailnge was first written down by Celtic Monks at Clonmacnoise, Lebor na hUidre also has references to the Pre-Christian site of Cruachan, one of the key scribes was Máel Muire mac Céilechair. Other manuscripts originating or connected with Clonmacnoise include, Chronicon Scotorum, Book of Lecan and Annals of Tigernach.

In the Book of Lecan it describes a particular story of the last Pagan King in Ireland Diarmait mac Cerbaill and details about his subsequent death. There was a prophecy by the Kings druid Bec mac Dé, who told of a threefold death he uttered on the day of his death, when he meet Colum Cille. Diarmait mac Cerbaill was murdered by the then king of Cruthin, Áed Dub mac Suibni. According to some early texts Irish kings Diarmait mac Cerbaill and Muirchertach mac Ercae may have both died a threefold death on Samhain, which may be linked to human sacrifice, similar to the dead victims discovered in Irish bogs, it was a ritual in ancient Ireland to sacrifice a king or someone of high status around the time of samhain, which according to Annals of the Four Masters it is an ancient tradition that goes back to the worship of Crom Cruach, a Celtic god associated with the harvest, Samhain and he is also associated to the headless horse man or Dullahan, as part of the Sídhe in Irish Mythology.

Soon after Diarmait's death Áed fled to the island of Tiree, where it was said he trained to be a Culdee priest, much to the disgust of both Columba and Adomnán. Columba himself on hearing the news had prophesied by means of a curse that a threefold death would happen to the bloody murderer Áed Dub mac Suibni.

Devenish Island (Damh Inis)
A Culdee (Céilí Dé) community on Devenish Island, Lough Erne in Fermanagh was founded by Saint Molaise, it consisted of an oratory and Round tower. The Devenish Island carried on the Pre-Christian tradition of Stone Carved heads structures that existed on the Pagan Boa Island also on Lough Erne, the lake itself bursts with legend, with its own banshee and ghosts. According to much older pre-Christian folklore the first ever settlement on the Island was said to have been established by Ollamh Fodhla.

St. Seachnall's Church, Dunshaughlin (Cill Sechnaill, Dún Seachlainn)
Sechnall (Secundinus) was the founder and patron saint of Domhnach Sechnaill, Co. Meath, who went down in medieval tradition as a disciple of St Patrick and one of the first bishops of Armagh. Although modern historians have disputed his connection with St Patrick and suggested this was later tradition in fact invented by Armagh historians in favour of their patron saint and that Secundinus is more likely to have been a separate missionary, possibly a companion of Palladius.

Secundinus was the author of an early Latin hymn in praise of St Patrick, known as Audite Omnes Amantes ("Hear ye, All lovers") or the Hymn of Secundinus written in trochaic septenarius, the earliest copy of which is found in the late 7th-century Antiphonary of Bangor.

Fore Abbey (Mainistir Fhobhair)
The Christian monastery at Fore was founded by St Feichin, it was estimated that there were as many as 300 monks and 2000 students in residence. Today, all that remains is the pre-Norman building of St Feichin's Church, which was built in the 12th century, on top of the original monastery, the ruins are located near the passage tomb and megalithic at Loughcrew Cairns. It was claimed that St Feichin once acted as a mediator between the Muimne, Luigne and Laigne of Connacht and Meath. The name is explained in this manner in a note added to the Félire Óengusso, which says that he received this name when his mother saw him gnawing on a bone and exclaimed "my little raven!" The placename of "Fore" is the anglicised version of the Irish "Fobhar", meaning "water-springs". There are two wells associated with St Feichin: one was called Doaghfeighin well and the other Tobernacogany from the Irish meaning "Well of the Kitchen".

Scattery Island (Inis Cathaigh)
A Céile Dé Monastery existed on Scattery Island or Inis Cathaigh which consisted of a monastery and Round Tower. The island was once the hermitage of Senán mac Geircinn, a 6th-century saint. The saint's name of Senan is said to have derived from the Christianized and masculized version of Sionann (pronounced Shannon), a pagan River Goddess associated with the source of the River Shannon. The word  translates as "sea serpent", which formed part of the Aos sí in Irish folklore; it was a legendary sea monster going back to Pre-Christian times that once inhabited the island and terrorised the people on the island.  is also associated with the word "battle" which Saint Senan fought and won against the giant serpent. According to legend the  advanced "its eyes flashing flame, with fiery breath, spitting venom and opening its horrible jaws", but Senan made the sign of the cross, and the beast collapsed and was chained and thrown into the dark waters of Doolough Lake.

A hagiography of Saint Senan and Amra Senáin ("The Eulogy of Senán") is contained within the Lebar Brec manuscript and also it contains explicit information such as the sex of the  that had lived on the island. The poetic eulogy was written by a friend of St Senan called Dallán Forgaill, who was a Chief Ollam of Ireland. Once Senan had expelled the Cathach, he drove him from Scattery into the dark waters of Doolough Lake. A local chieftain called Mac Tail, hired a druid to put a spell on the saint. However, as the druid landed on a nearby island, a tidal wave enveloped him and swept him to his death. It lies between Hog Island and Scattery, and can be seen at low tide.

In the Psalter Cathach of St. Columba, the opening paragraph letter of Q is decoratively depicted a serpent like head of a fishy beast with its mouth open and wearing a collared cross, the large letter looks like a lower case "g" but is in fact a "q" for "", the opening words of Psalm 91 which translate as "He who dwells". The psaltar was the central reason for what was known as the Battle of the Book near Benbulbin. Like Saint Senan, in Scottish folklore Saint Columba had a very similar encounter with a watery beast in the form of the Loch Ness monster in AD 565.
 
Another important monk who also trained and later served as bishop of Inis Cathaigh after the passing of Saint Senan was Saint Áedán who had been a disciple of Saint Senan on the island.

Culdees in Scotland

In Scotland a sacred pagan site had existed on the Island of Iona also known as Innis na Druineach (Isle of the Druids) before Saint Columba settled on the island and established a small Culdee hermitage, community and monastery. Diarmait of Iona was recorded at the Tallaght Monastery as an important figure of the Céli Dé of Iona.

Iona Abbey

The founder of the Iona Abbey, Saint Columba, before traveling to Scotland, was under the care of Cruithnechán and he developed a deeply religious feeling which was to lead to such great results, and he received the name in Old Irish of  meaning "Dove of the Cell", the word  meant an anchorite's cell, it only became associated with the broader meaning of "church" in a later form of Irish. While living at Iona, he also had his own wooden hermits cell located on the 'Tòrr an Aba' which translates to "the mound of the abbot".

Dunkeld

Saint Columba was a descendant of the royal dynasty Cenél Conaill similarly to the Culdee abbot of Dunkeld. The builder of Dunkeld Cathedral itself was Constantín mac Fergusa, it replaced the much earlier church built by Columba. The cathedral is commemorated by the Martyrology of Tallaght, which stated it as one of the principal Céli Dé monasteries of the day. When the kings of Dalriada were absorbed into the new unified Kingdom of Alba, the Tanist Stone was for a short period moved to Dunkeld and then later onto Scone Abbey.

Moot Hill

The druidic mound of Moot Hill, was the location for the Scottish Culdee's to build Scone Abbey(later owned by the Augustinian canons), today the Scone Palace is built on the land were the monastery once stood. Moot hill was similar to the Hill of Tara in its prehistory importance, Moot hill or Statute hill was known as a Brehon hill, a judicial place of assembly in pre-Christian times, its name has also been connected to the historical village of Muthill, an important Culdee centre. The Maigh Rein consisted of a race of ancient people called the Conmhaícne who were heavily associated with Sliabh an Iarainn.

 Monymusk Priory
 
The earliest Christian missionaries to arrive in Monymusk  in Aberdeenshire were the Culdees or 'Servants of God’, predating the Augustinians arrival and the building of Monymusk Priory. They were likely to be the followers of St. Ninian and his missionaries from Whithorn and into the land of the Picts. The name Monymusk derives from the Old Gaelic words "Muni or Muine muisc" which translates "noxious thicket or bush".The Culdee monks seem to have been an eremitical society of missionaries whose presence was felt in various parts of Europe and who objected to any form of conformity to a central ecclesiastical organisation. The Monymusk Reliquary is the most priceless surviving relic of the Celtic Church in Scotland. Originally it contained a bone of St. Columba, was venerated as a sacred relic and carried before the Scots army at Bannockburn. The earliest culdee Prior of Monymusk, had the ancient Gaelic title of Máel Brigte or in the later Latinized translation of Bricius meaning ‘devotee of St. Brigit’.

Fortingall

The village of Fortingall or in Gaelic , means "Escarpment Church", i.e., "church at the foot of an escarpment or steep slope". A Christian church was first founded in the village by Coeddi, bishop of Iona. In the grounds of the old church, there is what is estimated by some to be up to a 5000 years old yew tree, believed to be the oldest living tree in all of the British isles. Both the Gaelic pagan fire festivals of Samhain and Beltaine were celebrated at the nearby sacred mound of Càrn na Marbh, going back well before even the earliest Christian presence was established in the area.

Kingdom of the Rhinns

The Martyrology of Óengus gives details about the ancient Norse-Gael, Kingdom of the Rhinns also referred to as Na Renna or Kingdom of the isles, that once existed in the Western isles of Scotland and included other key locations along the Irish Sea. This kingdom includes the region of Galloway, a name that derives from the old Irish of ‘Gallgaidhel’, which means ‘foreigner(gall) living among the gaels(gaidhel)’, it referred to the population mix of Scandinavian and Gaelic ethnicity that inhabited Galloway in the Middle Ages. The Galloway area included a hammer-shaped peninsula in the extreme southwest of Wigtownshire in Scotland. The founding ruling dynasty of this Norse-Gael Kingdom was the powerful Uí Ímair or Dynasty of Ivar, founded by Ímar.

The 9th-century Félire Óengusso commoration of Saint Blane on the Isle of Bute, in which it described him as 'Blááni epscopi Cinn Garad i nGallgaedelaib', which translates as ‘Feast of Bláán, bishop of Kingarth in Gall-Ghàidheil', it seemed to suggest that at the time of Saint Blane in Kingarth and the Isle of Bute, the region was part of Na Renna and the Diocese of the Isles. The Norse-Gael, Kingdom of the Rhinns finally fell when the last king Magnus VI surrendered and conceded the Western Isles to the Kingdom of Scotland at the Treaty of Perth in 1266. Many of the kings of the Kingdom of the Isles are recorded in the Irish annals such as Annals of the Four Masters, Annals of Tigernach, Annals of Inisfallen and Senchus fer n-Alban.

Some of the first Norse settlers on the Orkney’s, Faroe’s and Iceland were said to be Norse–Gaels, referred to as Vestmenn. When Scandinavians first set foot on these islands they found a community of Culdee monks, referred to as papar. Numerous place names on the orkneys are named of these same eremitic Gaelic monks such as Pabbay,"Island of the papar (Culdee)" or Pabay.

Culdees in Wales and Cornwall

Although the name ‘Culdee’ is rarely used to refer to the Celtic Saints in Wales and Cornwall, many of them began as hermits, passed on pre-Christian druidic beliefs and traditions into the new Christian age. They originally lived as anchorites and anchoresses, established isolated retreats in the wilderness such as bogs, forests, and small offshore isles, generally in locations and places that held a significance going back to Druidic times, later these sites became major Celtic Christian monasteries. The most famous of the “insular” hubs of monastic life were on Anglesey and Bardsey. The Celtic Christian Church in Wales remained independent of the Holy See up to the late Middle Ages, it resisted any Gregorian reforms that Canterbury and Saint Augustine tried in impose on the early Welsh Church.

Saint David

Before the writings of St David's cult by chronicler Rhygyfarch in the 11th century, St David already had a significant reputation not only in Wales, but across the Irish Sea. The earliest known reference to the Saint David was to be found in the Catalogue of Irish Saints(AD730) as one of three Welsh saints along with Saint Cadog and Saint Gildas described as the ‘holy men of Britain’. The earliest recording of his feast day of the 1st Marsh was written in both the Latin Martyrology of Tallaght and the Old Irish Martyrology of the Félire Óengusso, both most likely the work of the same author, and certainly of the community of the Céli Dé of Tallaght around 800 AD. As early as the 9th century, the Celtic Culdee monks at Tallaght monastery referred to Saint David's old hermitage as ‘Dauid Cille Muni’ meaning David's cell of the thicket, in old Irish ‘Muni’ or ‘Muine’ (modern Irish) which translates to thicket or bush grove, from which came the cognate and old Welsh translation of ‘Mynyw’ and the Latin of ‘Menevia’. The title of  ‘Mynyw’ was as much attributed to the actual Saint as to the place, it moved with him through his life from his earliest hermitage. It has been suggested he spent his infancy, was educated and established his earliest ascetic community at a place called Henfynyw, which ina mutated form means the Old(Hen) bush(Mynyw). The ‘bishop of Mynyw’ can be traced right back to the Pre-Roman times and the ancient Celtic people of the Demetae also known as the Déisi, a race that once populated much of the Kingdom of Dyfed. In the Welsh triads, it mentions Mynyw as being one of the locations of the three courts of King Arthur, the other two being Celliwig and Pen Rhionydd.

Officially the feast day of Saint David was first established around 10th century initially in the early writings of the Annales Cambriae and then formerly celebrated from the 12th century, when he was canonized by Pope Callixtus II in 1120. David was officially recognized at the Holy See by Pope Callixtus II in 1120, thanks to the work of Bernard (bishop of Menevia). The Cathedral of St Davids or Menevia, was Britain's smallest city and began life as a humble tiny hermit's cell situated beside the river Alun. The River Alun flows southwestwards to St Brides Bay, the bay's derives its name from the Welsh version of the name Saint Brigid called Sant Ffraid. Scholars such as Sabine Baring-Gould, had suggested contrary to the popular belief that the Welsh Brigid(Sant Ffraid) was distinct and not likely to be Brigit of Kildare. She was an Irish nun in legend that first landed from the sea on a floating piece turf at Glan Conwy, in North Wales. The Martyrology of Donegal described her as ‘Brigid of Cille Muine’, where she had her Monastic Cell, with a feast day of 12 November. To the North of the bay is St David's Head, which according to the Culhwch and Olwen, was the location where the mythical Wild boar of the Twrch Trwyth first landed after crossing the Irish sea from Ireland before setting out its eventful journey through south wales and on to Cornwall.

The Welsh Celtic Scholar John Rhys had discussed a region just in the vicinity of St. David's or Mynyw, referred to in the Welsh Chronicle and the Synod of Chester as ‘Moni Iudeorum’. Rhys says that some scholars suggest this word, Iudeorum or Judeorum, may relate to the "Jutes," a Germanic tribe in Northern Europe, but that he believes such a view incorrect. Instead, Rhys put forward the view that they were of Canaanite Phoenicians origins, distantly related to ancient people of Munster and the Milesians race who had invaded Ireland and brought with them the Ogham Alphabet. The Demetae similar to other Celtic Briton tribes such as the Dumnonia were possibly descendants to the Phoenicians and have a lineage traced back to Hispania. The lands of Dumnonia were sometimes associated with the mythical islands of the Cassiterides such as the island of Ictis.

Caldey Island

Caldey Island history stretches back to over 1500 years to when the first Celtic monastery was built there in the 5th century. The island was named Ynys Bŷr after Saint Pyr, the sixth century, Pyr is named as abbot of the monastery around the year 500 in the Life of St Samson, he replaced Samson of Dol, the son of Amon of Demetae and Anna of Gwent. Since the early 20th century it has been home to a group of Cistercian monks, who carried on the Celtic traditions that had existed. There is a Caldey Ogham Stone in St Illtyd's Church, part of the Old Priory on Caldey Island. The stone dates to 5th or 6th Century, and it contains inscriptions both in Latin and in the ancient Ogham script which originated in Ireland, has inscribed on it 'Magl Dubr' meaning ‘the tonsured servant of Dubricius’ made by St Samson Abbot of Caldey Island. The ogham stone would have belonged to the old Celtic Christian church that existed before the present chapel, it was dug up in the priory grounds in the 19th century.

Sant Ffraid(Saint Brigid) and the Celtic Saints of North Wales

Sant Ffraid(Brigit) of North Wales was believed to be an Irish nun in legend that first landed from the sea on a floating piece turf at Glan Conwy. She also has strong connections with the island Anglesey. She is the patron saint of Trearddur bay which had a similar myth to Glan Conwy, that she was said to have arrived from Ireland on a floating piece of turf. The River Braint on the Menai Straits in Anglesey shares its name with the Saint but was actually named after her much earlier pre-Christian predecessor the pagan goddesses of brigid. An ancient piece of Welsh bardic poetry called ‘Gofara Braint’ describes the river overflowing and bursting its banks after the killing one of the last kings of the Brigantes called Cadwallon ap Cadfan. It depicts the old Celtic tradition that the king was married to the land and the river flooding its banks represents the land goddess in deep mourning at the news of his passing. The poem possibly dates back to an old oral bardic tradition in Wales and found as part of ‘The folds of the bards’ in the Book of Taliesin. The Celtic scholar D. A. Binchy put forward the theory that the Welsh word ‘Brenin’, instead of meaning ‘king’ had originally meant ‘a consort of the tribal goddess Brigantia’. 
The rivers name ‘Afon Braint’ may also have originated from early Irish settlers who had colonised the North Wales during the Sub-Roman period. Celts tended to name their lakes and rivers after goddesses. The name of Llŷn Peninsula is thought to be of Irish origin. ‘Llŷn’ translates from the Old Irish word for an tribe of Irish called the Laigin, of which the province of Leinster also derives its name. Ptolemy called the peninsula Ganganorum Promontorium (English: Peninsula of the Gangani); the Gangani were a sea-mobile tribe of Irish Celts, with possibly strong connections with the Coriondi tribe associated with South Leinster. Writers such as Charles-Edwards, Waldman and Mason had suggested a Coriondi link with a Northern Celtic tribe of Ancient Britons called the Corionototae.

An important Celtic saint of Llŷn Peninsula called Saint Beuno was first registered as a Celtic Saint with a feast day 21 April in the ninth-century in both the Irish martyrologies of Tallaght and of Gorman. He established the monastery of Clynnog Fawr which translates into English to 'the place of the holly-trees', according to legend it was said on his death bed to have had visions of the ‘all the saints and druids’. St Beuno’s well was traditionally used for the treatment of sick children, after bathing the treated child was carried to St Beuno’s chapel and laid on rushes overnight on Beuno’s tomb. Holy wells dedicated to Celtic saints or monasteries, in fact, would have once been connected with a Celtic goddess or female deity.

Bardsley Island seems likely to have been a seat of the Culdees, or Colidei, the first religious recluses of Great Britain, who sought Islands and desert places as hermitages, so they might in security worship the true God. The Convent at Bardsey (Enlli) was one of the most ancient religious Institutions in North Wales, established by the king of Llŷn Einion Frenin, who also founded a College on that Island, about the middle of the 9th Century. Dubricius, Archbishop of Caerleon,  who had resigned in favour of St. David’s, retired to Bardsey, where he died about the year 612, from which circumstance, it is evident that there must have been a religious establishment here prior to that period. Gerald of Wales writing in Speculum Ecclesiae about 1220, used the term “coelibes sive coli dei” translates as “celibate or to worship God” to refer to the hermit Celtic monks of both Enlli as well as for the monks of Beddgelert, Coli dei (Anglicised as Culdees) "is not Latin as Gerald assumes, in translating it as worshipers of God. It is comes from the Old Irish of Céilí Dé, meaning "servants of God". In the old orchard next to the 13th century Christian monastery on the island was discovered in 1998 by Ian Sturrock what was later classed as ‘the rarest apple trees in the world’.

Historians such as John Koch, Eric P. Hamp and several others put forward the view that the broader regional name of Gwynedd was in fact linguistically related to the Old Irish word of "Féni", which was a word in ancient Ireland meaning a pure aboriginal people, similar to the word Goídel, it associates with a tribe that inhabit the woods and forests, a Freeholding(Féine) class of people and according to Lebor Gabála Érenn as the name ‘Féni’ suggests were distant descendants of the legendary figure of Fénius, alleged to be one of the mythical inventors of the tree alphabet called Ogham. In Primitive Irish the word ‘weidh-n-‘ meant "Forest People" or "Wild People", while in Proto-Indo-European a combination of gwyn (“white, fair”) and ‘weydh’ (“wood, wilderness”). The welsh word for an Irishperson or Goidel was ‘Gwyddel’ which also has the double meaning in welsh of "wild or barbarian". In latin Gwynedd was called ‘Venedotia’ comes from the Brythonic of ‘Ueneda’ which means ‘Warrior Bands’, similar to the ‘Fianna’ who formed part of the Feni. Venedotia also possibly relates to the tribes of the Irish Venii and also to the British Venicones, an ancient Celtic tribe which once originated in what is today Fife, north of the Forth, a part of Scotland later associated with a strong tradition of providing the ancient legal office of "High Brithem" or in latinized form of Justiciar of Scotia.  The founding family of Earldom of Fife was Clan MacDuff, who were also the hereditary Abbots of the Culdee abbey at Abernethy, which features a Round tower, a typical landmark of many early Culdee monasteries. Scholars have suggested that 'Afarnach’s hall' in the Old Welsh poem of the Pa gur was a reference to Abernethy mentioned as part of Arthurian legends, in the poem Arthur leads a band warriors against creatures of the otherworld similar to that depicted Fionn mac Cumhaill and the Fianna in Irish mythology. The earliest reference to the town of the Venicones tribe was by Ptolemy as being ‘Orrea’ situated at Carpow, located on the same lands of Abernethy, once owned by a king of the Picts, Nechtan, also close to Pickish hill fort of Clatchard Craig, now controversially partially destroyed. During Roman times it was recorded as ‘Horrea Classis’ in the Ravenna Cosmography, a military stores base for the Roman fleet.The Venii tribe were also connected with what Ptolemy referred to them as the Venicnii in Donegal, they were identified being part of the Irish Feni, more tan likely related to the Northern Uí Néill. The Kingdom of Gwynedd was founded by the Venicones who were part of the Kingdom of Manaw Gododdin, north of the Forth. Brythonic-speaking, Kingdom of Manaw Gododdin would later become part of Hen Ogledd, the name ‘Manaw’ derives from the Celtic sea god Manann or Manawydan as known in Welsh mythology. One of the earliest Kings of Gwynedd was the legendary High King known as Maelgwn which means in Middle Welsh name meaning 'Princely Hound or Warrior’, a great grandson of Cunedda. 

Professor Dáithí Ó hÓgáin seems to indicate that Niall of the Nine Hostages maybe a descendant of the Gaulish seafaring Celtic tribe of the Veneti. According to Professor Dáithí Ó hÓgáin, Niall’s great ancestor was the legendary figure of Túathal Techtmar, possibly a name that comes from an earlier Gaulish god of Toutatis (“Ruler of the Tribe”). Túathal Techtmar was a leader of the northern branch of the Venii(tribes-men) in Ireland and notably lead the overthrow of the Laigin(Lance men) tribe at Tara around AD 300. The Venii tribe in Ireland only later formerly changed name to a class of people known as the ‘Irish Feni’, when Conn Cétchathach first established the Kingdom of Connacht and the Leath Cuinn, dividing of island North and South along the Esker Riada. 

Saint Govan

Saint Govan was a hermit who lived in the side of coastal cliff near Bosherston, Pembrokeshire. St. Govan's Chapel is built into the side of a limestone cliff, walls constructed from limestone, and consists of two chambers, one in the front and one in the back. He was believed to have been a disciple of Ailbe, who lived in Solva further along Pembrokeshire coast. Govan had served as an abbot at Dairinis under Ailbe, and he was also a disciple of St Senan at the monastery of Inis Cathaigh. ‘Govan’ comes from the cumbric version of the original old Gaelic name for the saint was ‘Goban’ which means ‘a disciple of a blacksmith’, the origin of the name probably goes back to a legendary figure known as ‘Goban Saor’ associated with an ancient island (mound of dry land) on bog land called Derrynaflan which translates as ‘oak of the flanns’, a place which also served as a key Céli Dé monastery in Ireland. A number of Irish Saints share the name of Saint Goban, other forms of the name include Gowan, Gofan(Welsh), and Gobain.

In the Arthurian legends, one version of the death of Sir Gawain, a myth which is more attributed to Welsh folklore, was said to have been laid to rest under Saint Govan's Chapel, having retired to live out his days on the site as a hermit after his uncle Arthur's death.

Saint Modomnoc

The Félire Óengusso names the beekeeper at Saint Davids monastery as a disciple called Modomnoc, who is said in myth on Saint David's consent to have introduced the honeybee to Ireland on his return to the island from Wales. In Celtic mythology bees were seen as beings of great wisdom and as spiritual messengers between this world and the gods of spiritual realm. The Irish Pagan Goddess Brigid was said to have kept an apple orchard in the Otherworld, the bees of her hives carried their magical golden nectar into the living world, Brigid is strongly connected with an island close to Glastonbury tor called Brides mound. The old and Celtic name for Glastonbury was Avalon, which means the ‘island of the apple orchards’, it stems from the Welsh word for apple ‘afal’. The apple tree was represented by ‘Queirt’ in the Celtic Ogham alphabet, the fruit has a strong association with islands and the Otherworld in Celtic Mythology, such as Tír na nÓg. Honey was the key ingredient of mystical alcoholic beverage of mead, according to the Brehon laws it was used in the pagan inauguration process for kings, the name is associated the sovereignty goddesses of Medb also known as the "mead-woman" or "she who intoxicates".

Saint Máedóc(Aidan) of Ferns

There had been several Irish saints named Aidan but this one seems to have been one of the most important and is mentioned in the Welsh triads as one of the three close disciples of Saint David. Aidan, referred to in Old Irish as Mo-áed-óc which translates as my(Mo), dear little(óc or óg) and sandwiched in between the name Áed. The anglicized name of ‘Marmaduke’ derives from the old Irish of ‘Máel Maedoc’ meaning devotee of Maedoc. The word ‘Máel’ translates ‘devotee of’ and is also associated with the followers of a number important Christian religious figures such as Máel Coluim (Columba), Máel Brigte (Brigid) and Máel Ísu (Jesus). Saint Máedóc traveled to Wales to study under Saint David at Menevia in Pembrokeshire for several years. Welsh tradition maintains that Aidan succeeded Saint David as the abbot of Menevia and for that reason Wales later claimed jurisdiction over Ferns in Wexford because a Welsh abbot founded it. The shrine of Breac Maodhóg is a relic associated with Saint Maedoc.

He became the first Bishop of Ferns after King Brandub of the Uí Ceinnselaig, a royal dynasty of Leinster granted him lands in the area, before Aidan's appointment the parish previously came most likely under the jurisdiction or see of Saint Sletty of Fiach. The monastery of Saint Marys Abbey in Ferns was built by the king leinster, Diarmait Mac Murchada, who was a Gaelic king noted in Irish history for his shady dealings with the Normans and the Earldom of Pembroke which ultimately lead to the Anglo-Norman invasion of Ireland in the 12th century. In Pre-Norman times, Ferns was once the ancient capital of Leinster and the seat of Diarmait Mac Murchada and his descendants. where he established a monastery.

A story about a stag was attributed and depicted in many artworks associated to both Aidan of Ferns and also to his namesake Aidan of Lindisfarne, about one day as he was sate reading in Connacht, a desperate stag took refuge with him in the hope of escaping pursuing hounds. Aidan miraculously by reciting his prayers made the stag invisible, and the hounds ran off. The story possibly relates to the myth that some early Celtic Saints developed a miraculous powers known as the spell of concealment which were special powers passed down from the Druid magic mist of a Pre-Christian era.

Saint Máedóc(Aidan) of Llawhadan

Saint Máedóc(Aidan) was also connected with the Welsh parish of Llanhuadain, the name translates as the "monastic enclosure(Llan) of St Aidan", the village is part of the broader community of Narberth, which was steeped in Welsh Pre-Christian history and mythology. Llanduadain and Robeston Wathen formed part of the ancient administrative area of Narberth Hundred. On one side of Narberth is Clynderwen, there is a bilingual Latin-Old Irish Ogham stone with the inscription Votecorigas written on it, who was a King of Dyfed in the early to mid-6th century.

The town of Narberth itself was connected to the Welsh Otherworld, its name stems from the ‘Gorsedd Arberth’ which translates as the Throne Mound, it was located near Pwyll's court, just south of the town and was seen in ancient Welsh myth as a key portal to the kingdom of the otherworld, the Welsh Gorsedd Arberth is a hill equivalent to the Sidh or a Teamhair in Irish mythology, a sacred inaugural and ancestorial mound.

It was on the Gorsedd Arbeth near the court of Dyfed the legendary prince of Dyfed, would become Pwyll Pen Annwn(Pwyll Head of the Annwn) when he had his first meeting with the otherworldly woman Rhiannon and they gave birth to a son Pryderi fab Pwyll, born in Narberth. Pryderi became the ruler of the seven Cantref of Dyfed and he was part of the mythical figures of Llŷr in Welsh mythology. In the Mabinogi third branch, Manawydan son of Llŷr and Rhiannon take a walk to the throne of Arberth (Gorsedd Narberth) to look over the land from the top of the mound when a great mist of enchantment falls on them. When the mist lifts, the entire kingdom of Dyfed was deserted, everyone and everything had disappeared without trace. The stories of the Mabinogion originated out of a middle Welsh oral tradition passed down generations which were later transferred to written text.

Rhiannon has similarities with Queen Macha in Irish Mythology. She represents the fertility of the land in the form of a Celtic Sovereignty goddesses, granting her future husband sovereignty as king of the land through the act of marriage. She also had strong connections with horses similar to Queen Macha who also had her prize Liath Macha and Dub Sainglend("grey of Macha"), who later features as one of the two Cú Chulainn chariot-horses in the tale of the Táin Bó Cúailnge.

Saint Illtud

In Wales, Saint Illtud was a very important Culdee figure in Celtic Christianity, he founded a monastery and college, a University of the Celtic Saints in Llantwit Major. The college known as Côr Tewdws is understood to have been founded c. 395, making it the earliest school, former or extant, in all of Great Britain. It has also been referred to as "the oldest college in the world". Other examples of Culdee hermitages are Saint Tudwal's Islands and Penmon abbey on the Isle of Anglesea, an island which has strong druidic history.

Saint Ailbe

The Martyrology of Tallaght lists the feast dates of five principal Pre-Patrician Christian Saints as being Abbán of Moyarny, Ailbe of Emly, Ciarán of Saigir, Declán of Ardmore and Ibar of Beggerin. All are said to be originally from Munster and also as being the earliest recorded Christian Saints that had existed in Ireland prior to the arrival of Saint Patrick. Most notable of the five is Ailbe of Emly, he is the patron saint of Munster and also known as St Eilfyw in Wales, where he founded a tiny community called St Elvis in Wales believed to have been one of the smallest parishes to be established in Britain, which is named after him, its just four miles north of the ancient city of St Davids. Its been suggested by certain scholars that it was Saint Ailbe who baptimized Saint David 454 AD at Port Clais in Dyfed. In 2000 Terry Breverton, a lecturer at Cardiff University, while promoting his book, suggested that the rock star Elvis Presley's ancestral roots came from the Celtic prehistoric site of Preseli Hills in Pembrokeshire and may have had links to a chapel at St Elvis.

Celtic Christianity in Cornwall

One of the earliest Celtic Christian Churches found in Britain is St Piran's Oratory and Old Church in Perranzabuloe, dating from the 6th century. A Cornish saint called Saint Madron was said to have been a disciple of Ciarán of Saigir, some scholars have suggested he may have been a Christianization of the pre-Christian, pagan goddess of Modron, mother to Mabon.

Bride's Hill (Glastonbury)
At St Michael's Church Tower on Glastonbury Tor, there's a carved depiction of Saint Brigid milking a cow at the entrance to the tower, Brigit has strong connections with nearby ancient Hermitage settlement of Bride's Hill located on an island in the Avalon Marshes. The Glastonbury Tor hill itself is associated with the Welsh Otherworld in Pagan times going back possibly centuries before the Christian church was built on its peak.

Druim Cetta

In the Martyrology of Tallaght, it lists one of the key figures in the founding of the early Christian Irish Church as Dallán Forgaill, his feast day is 29 January. In the Martyrology, its states that he later became a Saint although he was from a strong Bardic, Pagan tradition. At the time of the forming of Christianity he was in fact the Chief Ollamh of Ireland and was considered a leader of the Bardic community. He founded numerous churches in Ireland and came to be known as 'Forgaill Cille' meaning Forgaill of the Churches. What he is most remembered for is Amra Coluim Chille, which he wrote to show his gratitude to St Columba for saving the bards from expulsion at Druim Cetta.

The high king Aodh, son of Ainmire called for what amounted to a nationwide assembly of kings and leading clerics among other issues to firstly consider the expulsion of all the Seanchaí, filí and the Bards, the event took place on Mullagh hill, Limavady and was known as the Synods of Druim Cetta. Dignitaries from all over Ireland or Scotia as the island was referred to back at that time. An important delegation also arrived from the Dál Riata which was at that time an oversea colony of Scotia, travelled to take part in the Druim Cetta, led by St Columba and the then king of Dál Riata, Áedán mac Gabráin. According to some versions of the legends surrounding the event as St Columba had previously promised never to set foot on his native home land again after being banished to Iona, for his role ina event that was known as the Battle of the Book. When he returned for the Druim Cetta he refused to disembark from the boat. As a result, the boat was carried, with him still inside it, to the place of the great assembly. This is depicted on the official coat of arms of Limavady.

Some have suggested that St Canice may also have been part of the Dal Riata delegation that arrived at Druim Cetta. Saint Canice was born into a bardic family, his father Lughadh Leithdhearg was a distinguished bard. The Saint founded Drumachose Abbey close to Limavady, he is also the patron saint of nearby Roe Valley, the place where St Columba is said to have arrived by boat on the River Roe to take part in the Great Assembly on Mullagh Hill.

The ancient tree laws

In Irish mythology the Mother Goddess Danu symbolically represented the land, her consort is Bilé who was the god of Dead and the Otherworld. Bilé returns once a year from the veil of the Otherworld to be reunited with the goddesses of the land, he returns in the form of a sacred tree ( or ) at Bealtaine, it was one of the five sacred trees of Ireland. The word  translates from old Irish to sacred tree and it represents an Irish god who is the equivalent to the Celtic god of Belenus, in Milesian myth the ancestor of the Gaels was called Bilé as well, he was the father of Milesius and king of Galicia.

The Ogham alphabet was derived from twenty different native trees, the language resembles the branches of a tree and was etitched on stone or wood which was meant to be read from the ground up to reflect the direction a tree grows. The different type of trees also had strong associations with the passing of the year, for example holly (Lughnasa), ash (Imbolc), hawthorn (Bealtaine), oak (Summer Solistice), yew (Samhain) and willow (Imbolc). The ancient Irish instead of physically building temple structures, they associated their temples with those provided by natural world, hills and trees were seen as places important assemblies and events. Underneath or next to a tree judgments were made, Kings and Chiefs inaugurated and even during penal times children were thought lessons in the secret hedge schools, according to the tradition under the branches of an overhanging tree, usually the teacher was a wandering bard who had received his formal training from the then outlawed and extinct bardic schools. One of the most noted bards to establish and teach in a hedge school was the famous Aisling poet Eoghan Rua Ó Súilleabháin.

The seven most important trees which were categorized in the highest classification  for protection were the oak, scot pine, hazel, ash, yew, apple and the holly. These trees were all referred to as "the Chieftains of the woods" and any damage inflected on them would result in the most severe punishment, the same kind of penalty that would be imposed upon a person who was found guilty of killing the Noblest Chieftain (person). According to another law text Bechbretha "Bee Judgements", the fines for damages became even harsher or heavier if the tree was tampered with during a time of growth rather than a time of dormancy. Tragically, considering the value placed on trees in ancient Ireland, today Ireland is among the countries with the least woodland cover in the whole of Europe; only 11% of the island is covered by trees and, the vast majority being conifers, most are planted for purely economic or farming purposes rather than unfettered wild wooded oak forests.

The Brehon laws and Anglo-Norman invasion of 1169

The first real effort to encroach on the Irish laws came with the Anglo Norman invasion in the 12th century, led by Richard de Clare, 2nd Earl of Pembroke, commonly known as 'Strongbow'. The Normans also claimed they were issued with the Laudabiliter by Pope Adrian IV which gave official Vatican approval for the Anglo-Normans to invade and forcefully bring the native Irish Christian church under the jurisdiction of Holy See of Rome.

The invasion came about due to the deposed King of Leinster, Diarmait Mac Murchada enlisting the help from King Henry II England in order to recover his kingdom in 1167. Diarmait Mac Murchada was deposed by the High King of Ireland, Ruaidrí Ua Conchobair (Rory O' Connor) for the abduction of Derbforgaill, the wife of King of Breifne, Tiernan O'Rourke. Ultimately Diarmait Mac Murchada enlisted the military support of the Earl of Pembroke(nicknamed "Strongbow") in order to regain his title.

A conflict occurred between the native Brehon laws and the newly imposed Norman laws over who should be the successor to Diarmait Mac Murchada as King of Leinster. After the King, passed away, the Brehon laws recognised his eldest son Domhnall Caomhánach mac Murchada through the Kings derbfine, he was the chosen Tánaist to succeed him as the king of Leinster, in keeping with the laws of Tanistry. The Norman laws however supported the Anglo-Norman leader Strongbow claim as the successor Diarmait Mac Murchada on the basis that he was married to the king's daughter Aoife Mac Murchada. Strongbow tried to present the argument that he should inherit the title through his wife bloodlines.

The Brehon laws and 1925 case of the Erne fishermen

The revival of the Brehon laws proved crucial in the twentieth century in the case of Kildoney fishermen caught poaching salmon between the Assaroe Falls and River Erne tidal estuary. It was one of the longest-running and complex cases in the country's history. Fishing rights on the river estuary were under the ownership of the Erne Fishing Company, originally owned by a landowner, and this had been the case for three centuries since the introduction of the common law legal system. Natives or locals of Ballyshannon were legally restricted from benefiting or fishing in the river tidal estuary which was teeming with salmon. One of the most notable previous owners of the Erne Fishing Company was a landowner named William Conolly; he was also known for building the cursed Hellfire club on top of already existing ancient sacred cairn on Montpelier hill.

In 1925 six local fishermen from Kildoney were arrested poaching in broad daylight. Many believe it was deliberate provocation in order to legally challenge or contest legitimacy of the legal status quo at that time. They were caught by an Erne Fishing Company patrol boat, the subsequent court case proved to be the longest in the country's history and ultimately the courts examined interpretations of the Brehon laws, which proved to be key in deciding the final verdict.

It considered the legal rights of individuals to fish not just in terms of the then-existing common law system but also from Magna Carta before it and then even further back to Ancient Gaelic laws. Two of the leading scholarly authorities in Brehon law at that time, Eoin MacNeill and D.A. Binchy were called on to give evidence on behalf the Kildoney Fishermen. Eoin MacNeill and Binchy produced extracts from the Senchas Mar as evidence in trial. In Ancient Ireland everyone had equal rights to fish within the boundaries of any individual Tuatha or Petty State,  or "the salmon of the place", under the old system there was no evidence of individuals or groups having sole ownership to the exclusion of all others. At the trial MacNeill and Binchy also supported their case with the ancient tract  or "Of the Confirmation of Right and Law". It was the first court case to be decided on interpretation of the Brehon laws in over three centuries.

This particular case was seen as a significant landmark in the sovereignty of the modern Irish state. The owner of Erne Fishery Company, Robert Lyon Moore, attempted to appeal the decision of the Irish courts to the Privy council in London. The government at the time promptly passed legislation that abolished any right to appeal on any decisions made in courts in Ireland to the Privy council in London, which was deemed outside the jurisdiction of the state. A Fianna Fáil government brought in the Constitution Act in 1933 just after the completion of the case in July 1933.

Craftsmen in ancient Ireland

According to Brehon Law, craftsmen were regarded with great respect in pre-Christian Ireland. An artist was afforded the same privileges as the lowest noble. This tradition and respect for people of craft was carried on into the Christian age, which can be seen by the artisanry exhibited and associated with the founding monasteries. The Triads of Ireland mentions three chief artisans of Ireland. Assicus or Tassac was assigned to Saint Patrick, Conleth to Saint Brigid and Daig to Ciarán of Saigir. Their skills were so highly regarded that they became saints themselves.

One of the most notable of these craftsmen was Saint Assicus, who became the first Bishop of Elphin. He came from druidic family lineage but converted to Christianity, as was the case with many of the earliest Irish Saints, with the advent of Christianity. Artefacts such as Cross of Cong, The Aghadoe Crosier and Shrine of Manchan of Mohill have been associated with a workshop linked to Saint Assicus in Elphin. Many believe Saint Assicus is actually the same person as Saint Tassac. Saint Tassac of Raholp had a similar trade. He was the metalworker who decorated the first-ever Christian church in Ireland, established by Saint Patrick near present-day Downpatrick, called the Church of Raholp in Saul. The church started out as an old barn donated by a local Druid chieftain called Dichu.

Law of the Tanistry

The ancient law of succession or Tanistry has its origins in Brehon law. It was a Gaelic custom where legally the eldest son (Tánaiste) succeeded his father to exclusion of all collateral claimants. In terms of land inheritance it was a similar system to Gavelkind in ancient Ireland.

According to Adomnán, life of Columba, it states when selecting a capable king for Dál Riada, Saint Columba acted in accordance with the Law of the Tanistry when he deselected the then Tánaiste, a feeble prince, Eoganán in favour of his younger brother Áedhán, both sons of Gabrán mac Domangairt. Áedhán had trained at the institute of Iona. Saint Columba sat him on the "stone of fate", and he solemnly anointed him King of the Scottish Dal Riada. It was said to be the first known example of an ordination in Britain and Ireland.

Brehon law during the early/late Middle Ages

Towards the end of the 13th century, elements of native Irish Brehon law through necessity were incorporated into the English common law in the areas of The Pale; it was referred to as March Law. King Edward I of England, had a need at that time to divert much-needed resources from Ireland, to concentrate on conflicts elsewhere. As a result, English settlers, especially outside of the Pale, began to develop Irish customs and manner of dress and become accustomed to the native Brehon law.

Its popularity among what were known as the Old English (Pre-Reformation) in Ireland would become a source of concern for future English monarchs and ultimately accumulated in King Edward III later enforcing the Statutes of Kilkenny in 1366 to counteract its growing popularity among his own subjects in Ireland.

A high-profile example of Old English descent in favour of ancient Irish law/Custom happened during the period of the reformation, an Archbishop of Armagh and Primate, George Cromer was found to have applied Brehon Law in granting an Éraic of 340 cows to the Earl of Kildare due to his foster brother's death. As a result of George Cromer's act of insubordination he was defrocked by King Henry VIII. Only to be later pardoned during Queen Mary I era.

One of the most noted Hiberno-Norman dynasties in Ireland called the Earls of Ormond also known as the Butlers of Ormond observed English laws but also selectively on certain customs preferred to adhere to the old native Gaelic or Brehon Laws. They were known to have employed numerous Brehon judges from the MacEgan legal family based in Lower Ormond. Gilla na Naemh Mac Aodhagáin and Seaán Buidhe Ó Cléirigh served as the two principal scribes for Sir Edmund MacRichard Butler of Polestown. They transcribed texts and added sections to a manuscript called  for their patron's uncle James Butler, White Earl of Ormond. Notably Sir Edmund MacRichard Butler's father Sir Richard Butler, defied the English King and the Statutes of Kilkenny by choosing to marry the daughter of an Irish Noble.

Bretha Dein Chécht (judgment of Dian Cecht)

Bretha Dein Chécht, is an ancient medical law tract first appeared in Senchas Már. It offers a detailed account of compensations for wounding depending on the nature of the injury, its severity and what part of the body. Much of the translation work of this old Irish manuscript is attributed to the 20th-century scholar D.A. Binchy, who first published his findings in the Eriu journal.

In pre-Christian Ireland legend the first ever hospital was Bhrionbherg (House of Sorrows), set up by Macha Mong Ruadh, a legendary Irish queen, at Emain Macha (Navan Fort), an ancient ruler of the five Kingdoms of Tara and also the daughter of Áed Rúad. Other hospitals spread to all the other kingdoms; these institutes would later be carried on by monks, as parts of monasteries during the Christian times. Brehon law laid down a medical code of ethics on regulations and management for treatment of the sick and wounded, and also details of patient entitlements, compensations and fees.

Bretha Crólige (Binchy, 1938) was also part of this law tract; it highlights obligations in the event of an injury to person. The cost of maintenance and entitlements to the injured party are carefully laid out in the tract. This particular law tract highlighted the fact that Druids' sick maintenance was exactly the same as a Bóaire (ordinary freeman), regardless of status.

deals with a system of laws in regards to clientship and livestock farming. Covered in this manuscript is the treatment of cattle and also of domestic animals. The law tract describes a wide variety of domestic pet animals that people kept in pre-Christian Ireland, many would be deemed as unconventional domestic pets to keep nowadays, the list included crows, ravens, cranes, badgers, wolves, foxes and others.

Early Irish literature and Brehon law depicts a tenderness towards animals was characteristic of Irish people. When cattle were taken on a long journey, they were fed at intermediate stations along the route with food and water. Brehon laws also had penalties for injury or theft offences against domestic animals such as cats, dogs, cattle and horses.

According to Senchas Mor the third most popular pet in pre-Christian Ireland after cats and dogs was the crane (Peata Corr). In pagan times, the druids saw cranes as the heavenly transporters of the human soul to isles in the west. Some suggest fires were lit under a migration flight path of the now extinct in Ireland, Grús at Dun Aonghasa. The fort is associated with the Aengus the foster son of Midir who is said to have owned three mystical magical cranes.

This pre-Christian custom of adopting unusual native animals as pets was carried on by some of the Irish abbots into the Christian age. Saint Columba was also commonly known as the "crane cleric" as he kept a pet crane in his home on the Island of Iona, In the Book of Kells there is a depiction of a bald red patch on a crane's crown. Saint Ciarán of Clonmacnoise owned a pet fox, Saint Brendan of Clonfert had a pet raven, Saint Brigid adopted and offered sanctuary to a boar, Saint Colman mac Duagh had a pet rooster that also served as an alarm clock and Saint Colman of Templeshambo owned a flock of sacred ducks, that were so tame they came and went at his call.

Cai of the Fair judgment

Numerous myths associated with different invaders in Irish mythology exist as to the origins of Brehon Law. In Milesian folklore, The Scholar's Primer describes the first Brehon or lawgiver as being Caí Caínbrethach ("Fair-judgment"), he fostered and was a mentor to a Son of Mil known as Amorghain Glúngheal, who later would become Chief Ollamh of Ireland and he also was said to be the 72nd disciple of the school of Fénius Farsaid. Caí in legend, first arrived in Ireland in the company of the Mil Espaine on board a ship, during the Milesian conquest of Ireland.

The word  in old Irish translates to "law" in English. Brehon law came under two categories, Cáin and Urradas. Cáin Law broadly applied to entire tribes, regions, all under a High King. Urradas law was at a more local level.

The character known as Kay in Medieval Welsh text is said to be based on Caí Caínbrethach.

The first volume of The Law of Distress was published in a Harleian Manuscript in 1865 and the second in 1869. It deals with ancient legal issues of Seizure by distraint of property for the satisfaction of debt, also laws related fosterage, tenure and social connections.
 
In the law tract , it states that three noble tribes passed a judgment at a Dál-Criche (territorial assembly) and divided Ireland between them. A Dál was similar to an Aonach, in that it refers to a ritual annual gathering of legislators at a fixed site of ceremonial importance in order, to among other rituals, collectively pass laws. In Connacht the most famous of these sites was in Cruachan near Tulsk, site of the kings of Connacht, it contains a large number of Ráth, Barrows, Mounds and Earthworks. In Old Irish the word "Dál" means assembly or conferring, for example in its modern Irish form,  translates to Assembly of Ireland. Dál was also associated with the old Irish word of Tulach (Hillock), which represented the place where ancient druidic ceremonial gatherings took place, it was usually a burial mound. Some place names derive from the word, such as Tullamore, Tullow or Tullynadal in Donegal which translates as "a mustering place".

Numerous categories or levels of assembly, at which laws were passed existed in ancient Ireland, the highest was the Feis Temrach at Tara (national level), Aonach (national or regional), Dál (Túath Sept Nobles), Cuirmtig (Túath members) and finally a Tocomra, where a Túath elected their own Taoiseach and Tánaiste. The main purpose of these gatherings was to promulgate and reaffirm the laws. The Chief Ollamh of Ireland coordinated the Feis at Tara, Ard Ollamh at Regional and Ollamh at a Tuath level.

The earliest reference in the Senchas Már to the reading of the law of Athgabdla at an assembly, took place at the Hill of Uisneach, just before the eve of Bealtaine about a hundred years before the birth of Christ, a uniform law of distraint passed for the whole of Ireland was adopted on the motion of Sen, son of Aigé. This did not prevent the gatherings at Uisneach from being for ages celebrated for gaiety and amusement.

Maeltine Mor Brethach (the great judgment)

Its unknown when the first rudiments of Brehon Law were first practised, some suggest as far back as the Iron Age. With it being orally practised, not many documented writings were produced prior to the Christian age. Some information was later passed on and translated or pieced together from the oldest surviving manuscripts by the endeavours of Christian Monks, much of it was in the form of myth and poetry.

One of the earliest mythical references to a judgment of a Brehon was following the second Battle of Moytura. Lugh agreed to spare Bris's life, if he ensured that Irish cows give milk in abundance, by teaching the people of the  agriculture.

The second Battle of Moytura was not the first documented mythical judgment by Brehon. According to Lebor Gabála the first-ever recorded case involved a dispute between Partholón and his adulterous wife, Dealgnaid; a Brehon was said to have adjudicated a settlement between both parties.

Morann's Collar

The  describes a famous mythical Brehon judge known as Morann Mac Máin (son of Cairbre Cinnchait), who was the Chief Ollam to High King Feradach Finnfechtnach. Morann would wear a Brehon  or collar, which was said to contract around his neck when he gave a false judgment and would then only loosen once he made a just one. He is also mentioned in the Ogam Tract for creating one of the three , used to interpret the Ogham alphabet. In ancient Irish law, the Ogham carved stones on a piece of land represented the underpinning of legal ownership to that land.

Morann is also associated with the manuscript  (The Testament of Morann), a medieval old Irish wisdom literature which gave advice to a prospective or future king. It was produced as a piece of insight for Feradach Finnfechtnach, just before he was made a high king. There are five known compositions of this genre in Old Irish, most notably Tecosca Cormaic or Bríathra Flainn Fína mac Ossu, although Audacht Morainn is the oldest. It is officially seen by many to be the forerunner to the 9th century Mirrors for princes, which was produced by an Irish Christian monk called Sedulius Scottus.

Nemed Schools of Law

The Bretha Nemed school's, trained bards in the poetico-legal disciplines, allegedly these schools were all located in Munster, they may originally had strong connections with the Mumu Kingdom. The old Irish word 'Nemed' means "privileged" or "holy" in English, the term was also associated with a certain ancient mythical character and race that once existed on the island. According to the Lebor Gabála Érenn the first ever Beltane fire in Ireland was lit on the Hill of Uisneach by a Nemedian druid called Mide. The fire was seen from as far away as the Hill of Tara, when those at Tara saw it, they followed suit and lit their own fire. The Old Irish name for the county of Meath derives from this same Nemedian druid called Mide and it is also the old Irish word for "centre" which is generally used as a reference to the geographical and spiritual importance of the Hill of Uisneach.

In  (First Judgment of Privileged Ones) some of its composition is attributed to the accounts of three kinsmen, Fornannán (a Bishop), Máel Tuili (a poet), Báethgalach hua Búirecháin (a judge), who flourished during the reign of Cathal mac Finguine. This manuscript mostly tackles legal matters concerning the early church and the importance of the role of ecclesiastical scholars, which is reflected also in the Uraicecht Becc and Collectio canonum Hibernensis both are connected with the Nemed school of law. The Collectio canonum Hibernensis was in created in both Iona Abbey and also at Dairinis near Waterford. A translated Old Irish copy was found among the Bretha Nemed Déidenach law manuscripts.

It was a style of poetry that was associated with the legendary figure of Amergin Glúingel, in Milesian mythology its claimed he passed both the first judgment and recited the first Irish language poem (The Song of Amergin) when he set foot on a land that would become known as Ireland. Although much earlier groups or invaders in their respective Mythologies also have accounts of judgments being made in Irish history, groups such as Túatha Dé Danann and Cessairians.

Book of Aicill and Fénechus Law

The first attempt at transferring Brehon law into written code or legal text was carried out under the patronage of King Cormac mac Airt. He produced the Book of Achall or Aicill, written between 227 and 266 AD, which relates mainly to criminal law. Cormac is said to have retired to the mound of Aicill, in what is now called Skreen near Tara and started working on the book.

Another later significant document was Senchas Már or Fénechus Law (that which relates to the Féine), drafted around 438 AD by a select committee of nine, presided over by Saint Patrick. Senchas Már is mostly associated with ancient Civil law, selective parts of pre-Christian Irish law that were deemed non-compatible to the teachings of the new Christian age were excluded by the committee from the final written tract. Dubthach maccu Lugair was the judge or Brehon chosen by St Patrick, as part of the committee of three kings, three bishops and three professors of literature, poetry and law, in the creation of Senchas Már.

The earliest tracts were produced in the oldest archaic form of Irish dialect known as 'Bérla Féine', some also suggest the written text to be an ancient poetic legal dialect of Dubthach. According to Irish myth the "Feine" were descendants of a legendary figure known as Fénius Farsaid, who is said to have created the ancient language "Bérla Féne". These early manuscripts proved a difficult challenge for centuries after to translate for future academics and even to later Brehons. Only in the seventeenth century did Irish Gaelic scholars such as Eugene O'Curry and John O'Donovan manage to translate much of these original text, but only due to a life-long study.

Berla Fene was one of the five extensions of the Goídelc language; it was known as the legal dialect or dark speech of the Filí and the Brehon. The 7th-century manuscript Auraicept na n-Eces or "Scholars Primer" describes the mythical origins of the Ollav, 72 named linguistic scholars who had assisted Fenius Farsaid, later asked him to select from all the languages, and develop a tongue that nobody else should have but which might belong to them alone. Fenius created Berla Tobaide and later commanded Gaedheal son of Eathor or Goídel mac Ethéoir to set about arranging and regulate into five dialects and name them all after himself. Berla Fene makes up the corpus of the earliest written manuscripts and proved the most challenging to translate in the Christian Era.

The first detailed scientific study of ancient Irish law tracts took place in the 20th century. A comprehensive study of difficult Old Irish law texts was carried out by German Celticist Rudolf Thurneysen, English linguist Charles Plummer and Irish Historian Eoin Mac Neill.

The Bee Laws

One of the more unusual tracts in Brehon law was known as the Bee Judgment (Bech Bretha). In the twenty page manuscript it goes into great detail about legal entitlements or ownership of a swarm (faithche), hives, nests or honey found on a piece of land or property, discovered by a finder or property/land owner and also a detailed compensation scheme for victims of bee stings.

Honey was considered of great value at a time before the advent of sugar cane. It had many applications such as basting meat while roasting, treating salmon while broiling, also used as an ingredient in lard and drinks. One of the more important Celtic customs was in the production of mead (fermenting of honey with water), in medieval times the alcoholic drink had mystical and religious qualities, a noted example was Lindisfarne Mead, produced by the Celtic Monks on Holy Island.

The word ‘mether’ we mentioned in an earlier post derives from the word for mead. So ‘mithered’ may mean ‘confused and bothered as a result of too much mead’!

The word mether (a mead drinking vessel) is derived from the word for mead. So the word "mithered" may mean "confused and bothered as a result of too much mead".

Mead is also associated with the wife of Ailill and Sovereignty Queen, Medb. In Pagan times, Brehon law states that before a new High King can be inaugurated they must first accept an alcoholic drink in form of mead off the Queen of the Land, and thus become intoxicated by her.

Brigh Brigaid
Brigh Brigaid, also spelled as Briugaid or Brughaidh, (flourished circa CE 50, Ireland) was a woman who held office as a brehon, or judge, in Ireland in the 1st century CE. Brigh is mentioned in the Senchus Mór, a compendium of the ancient laws of Ireland, and her decisions were cited as precedents for centuries after her death. Her name is possibly associated to the Celtic Pagan Goddesses, who had a strong connection with the bardic traditions. She was known as the "great brig" or brigit, an honored brehon women who is said to have healed a fellow judge, Sencha mac Ailella blotched face by correcting his biased judgment against women.

Decline of Brehon Law

The gradual decline of Brehon law began during the Norman conquest, it continued to co-exist with an imposed legal system from the 12th century onwards. It was only in the middle seventeenth century efforts were made to completely suppress it out of existence in favour of the colonial common law system, which has remained the official legal system right up to the present day. In the late 17th century it was deemed a serious criminal offence to be found in possession of old Irish law book and often punishable by transportation to penal servitude.

It was only in the middle 19th century when two scholarly Church of Ireland clergymen named James Henthorn Todd and Charles Graves, a professor of Trinty College, he was the grandfather of another Gaelic scholar Robert Graves persuaded the British Government to set up a Brehon Law Commission in 1852 in order to save the ancient law text. Native Irish Scholars Eugene O'Curry and John O'Donovan were employed by the commission to translate old law manuscripts.

Brehons had a tradition of providing bardic schools, from pre-Christian times up until middle of the seventeenth century. They provided education in Irish language, literature, history and Brehon law. These scholarly institutions facilitated up to what amounted to university education. They had a history of producing an abundance of Poets and Bard's. The imposition of Penal law, Popery Act combined with the first Cromwellian regime saw the suppression of these native educational institutions. As a result, secret hedge schools began to appear up until the Penal laws ended.

See also
 Kritarchy
 Mac Aodhagáin
 Mac Fhirbhisigh
 Ó Cianáin
 Ó Cléirigh
 Ó Cobhthaigh
 Ó Domhnalláin
 Ó Draighnáin
 Ó Duibh dá Bhoireann
 Ó Breaslain
 Ó Deoradhain
 Sister Fidelma a fictional Brehon, created by novelist Peter Berresford Ellis

Notes

References

External links
Higgins, Noelle. "The Lost Legal System: Pre-Common Law Ireland and Brehon Law", School of Law and Government, Dublin City University
The Old Gaelic Order ...as described by Ben McBrady(descendant of Dubthach maccu Lugair)

Early Gaelic law
 
Irish women judges
Judges
Year of death unknown